Chelis beanii, or Bean's tiger moth, is a moth of the family Erebidae. It was described by Berthold Neumoegen in 1891. It is found in the Rocky Mountains, where it has been recorded from Alberta, British Columbia and southern Montana. The habitat consists of open forests, subalpine meadows and parklands.

The length of the forewings is 16–17 mm. The forewings are smoky medium to dark rose with wide darker rosy brown-grey lines. The hindwings are lighter clear to smoky rose pink, marked by a darker rosy grey discal spot and median line. Adults are on wing from mid-July to mid-August.

The larvae probably feed on various herbaceous plants.

This species was formerly a member of the genus Neoarctia, but was moved to Chelis along with the other species of the genera Holoarctia, Neoarctia, and Hyperborea.

References

Arctiina
Moths described in 1891